Kim Seon-su (born 3 June 1989 in Muju) is a Korean biathlete. She competed at the  2022 Winter Olympics, in Women's sprint, and Women's pursuit. She competed at the Biathlon World Championships 2019.

References

External links

1989 births
Living people
South Korean female biathletes
Olympic biathletes of South Korea
Biathletes at the 2022 Winter Olympics
Sportspeople from North Jeolla Province
Biathletes at the 2007 Asian Winter Games
21st-century South Korean women